Sardar Attique Ahmed Khan is a Pakistani-Kashmiri politician who served as the Prime Minister of Azad Jammu and Kashmir twice, from 24 July 2006 to 6 January 2009 and from 29 July 2010 to 26 July 2011. He also presides over the All Jammu and Kashmir Muslim Conference and served as the leader of the parliamentary opposition from 15 January 2009 to 22 October 2009, and has been elected five times as a Member of the Legislative Assembly. He serves as the member of the Supreme Council of the Muslim World League.He Belongs to Dhund-Abbasi Tribe.

Political profile 

 President All Jammu & Kashmir Muslim Conference – the oldest political party of the entire State of Jammu & Kashmir in its 80th year. Since 2002 unanimously elected consecutively for 3rd time (2002, 2006 & 2009) as 9th the President of the party.
 Elected 5 times as Member Legislative Assembly (MLA) of Azad Jammu and Kashmir since 1990.
 Elected first time as Prime Minister of Azad Government of the State of Jammu and Kashmir held this office from 24 July 2006 to 6 January 2009
 Leader of the Parliamentary Opposition from 15 January 2009 to 22 October 2009.
 Re-elected 2nd time as Prime Minister by the same House on 29 July 2010 till 26 July 2011.
 As a political worker served as Chairman Youth & Students Wing (1984–1990) and later as Chief Organizer of the party (1992–2001).
 Introduced the concept of grassroot level political participation and consultation through formation of party units at polling stations level.
 As Chief Organizer of All Jammu and Kashmir Muslim Conference (AJKMC) expanded the party platform for the minorities/non-Muslims for the first time in the State.
 Founder Chairman of Pakistan Assembly of Muslim Youth (PAMY) that included mainstream youth leadership of all parties.

Educational credentials 
Sardar Attique Ahmed Khan has Master's degree in International Relations. Arabic language course from Islamic University of Madinah Munawwarah, Saudi Arabia.

Sardar Attique Ahmed Khan is the son of Sardar Abdul Qayyum Khan, who is also Known as Mujahid-e-Awwal. He is considered a prominent Kashmiri leader of his era.

References

Interview with a Spanish paper

1955 births
Living people
Pahari Pothwari people
People from Azad Kashmir
Politicians from Azad Kashmir
Prime Ministers of Azad Kashmir
Azad Kashmir MLAs 2016–2021
Azad Kashmir MLAs 2021–2026